Yellareddy is a census town and Revenue division in Kamareddy district of the Indian state of Telangana. It is located in Yellareddy mandal of Kamareddy District. It was previously in Nizamabad district.

References 

Census towns in Kamareddy district